Miner Gibbs Norton (May 11, 1857 – September 7, 1926) was an American lawyer and politician who served one term as a U.S. Representative from Ohio from 1921 to 1923

Biography 
Born in Andover, Ohio, Norton attended the public schools, the National Normal University, Lebanon, Ohio, and Baldwin-Wallace College, Berea, Ohio.
He graduated from Mount Union College, Alliance, Ohio, in 1878 and from the law department of Yale College in 1880.
He was admitted to the bar in the latter year and commenced practice in Cleveland, Ohio.
He served as director of law of Cleveland, Ohio 1895-1899.
He served as chairman of the Republican State executive committee in the early nineties.
United States appraiser for the northern district of Ohio 1905-1909.

Congress 
Norton was elected as a Republican to the Sixty-seventh Congress (March 4, 1921 – March 3, 1923).
He was an unsuccessful candidate for reelection in 1922 to the Sixty-eighth Congress.

Later career and death 
He resumed the practice of law in Cleveland.
He was appointed by President Coolidge collector of customs at Cleveland on February 7, 1925, and served until his death in Cleveland, Ohio, September 7, 1926.
He was interred in Oakdale Cemetery, Jefferson, Ohio.

Sources

1857 births
1926 deaths
National Normal University alumni
Baldwin Wallace University alumni
University of Mount Union alumni
Ohio lawyers
Yale Law School alumni
People from Ashtabula County, Ohio
19th-century American lawyers
Republican Party members of the United States House of Representatives from Ohio